is a Japanese private women's college with its headquarters in 4-1-1 Ōsakaue, Hino, Tokyo, Japan. The school was founded by poet and educator Utako Shimoda in 1899. It was chartered as a university in 1949.

Overview

University as a whole 

Jissen Women's University views the private women's university "Shimoda School" (later renamed "Tōyō School"), opened by Utako Shimoda in 1882 (Meiji's 15th Year), as its origin. This developed and became Jissen Girls' School in 1899 (Meiji's 32nd Year). In the early days of the school opening, it was located in modern-day Kudan, Chiyoda City, Tokyo, but relocated to Tokiwamatsu in Shibuya in 1901 (Meiji's 34th Year). With the educational system reform, it transitioned to a university under the new system and became Jissen Women's University in 1949 (Shōwa's 24th Year).

In 1986 (Shōwa's 61st Year), it completely relocated from Shibuya to Hino, but Shibuya Campus was opened in 2014 (Heisei's 26th Year). Currently, the Faculty of Humanities, the Faculty of Human and Social Studies and the Junior College are located on Shibuya Campus and the Faculty of Human Life Science is located on Hino Campus.

Educational Ideals 
Nurturing women who are capable of displaying dignity, elegance, independence and self-management.

Brief history 
 1882 (Meiji's 15th Year) Utako Shimoda founds a private girls' school (later changes the name of the school to "Tōyō School") in Kudan, Tokyo.
 1899 (Meiji's 32nd Year) It founds the private Jissen Girls' School and the Girls' Arts and Crafts School in Kōjimachi, Tokyo as a project of the Imperial Women's Association. Utako Shimoda becomes the first principal.
 1903 (Meiji's 36th Year) Jissen Girls' School and Girls' Arts and Crafts School relocate to a new school building in the Tokiwamatsu Detached Palace in Shibuya, Tokyo.
 1925 (Taishō's 14th Year) It establishes Jissen Women's Specialized School.
 1928 (Shōwa's 3rd Year) It grants the privilege of English Literature secondary-school teacher licenses without examination to specialized faculty English Literature graduates.
 1945 (Shōwa's 20th Year) Many school buildings are destroyed by fire due to war damage.
 1949 (Shōwa's 24th Year) It transitions to a university under the new system and establishes Jissen Women's University.
 1950 (Shōwa's 25th Year) It establishes Jissen Women's Educational Institute Junior College.
 1986 (Shōwa's 61st Year) The university and graduate school completely relocate to Hino Campus.
 1995 (Heisei's 7th Year) The Faculty of Home Economics is renamed the Faculty of Human Life Science.
 2004 (Heisei's 16th Year) It newly establishes the Faculty of Human and Social Studies.
 2014 (Heisei's 26th Year) The Faculty of Humanities, the Faculty of Human and Social Studies and the Junior College relocate to Shibuya Campus.

Basic data

Locations 
 Hino Campus (Ōsakaue, Hino City, Tokyo)
 Shibuya Campus (Higashi, Shibuya City, Tokyo)

Image

Emblem 
It has the shape of a cherry blossom.

School song 
 Lyrics: Utako Shimoda, Composition: Kōichi Sawada

Education and research

Organization

Faculties 
 Faculty of Humanities
 Department of Japanese Literature
 Department of English Literature
 Department of Aesthetics and Art History
 Faculty of Human Life Science
 Department of Food and Health Science
 Registered Dietitian Major
 Food Science Major
 Health and Nutrition Major
 Department of Human Environmental Science
 Department of Life and Culture
 Life Psychology Major
 Early Childhood Education Major
 Department of Contemporary Human Life Science
 Faculty of Human and Social Studies
 Department of Humanity and Social Science
 Department of Contemporary Sociology
 Junior college
 Department of Japanese Communication
 Department of English Communication

Graduate schools 
 Graduate School of Humanities
 Japanese Literature Program (Master's and Doctoral Programs)
 English Literature Program (Master's Program)
 Aesthetics and Art History Program (Master's and Doctoral Programs)
 Graduate School of Human Life Science
 Food Science and Nutrition Program (Master's and Doctoral Programs)
 Human Environmental Science Program (Master's Program)
 Graduate School of Human and Social Studies
 Humanity and Social Science Program (Master's Program)

Education

On-campus scholarship 
Jissen Women's University has its own scholarship program, and has reached the point where students can apply for them according on their situation.
 Grant-type
 Shimoda Scholarship
 Sakura Scholarship
 University President's Award Scholarship
 Sugako Tonohara Scholarship
 Noboru and Akiko Hayama Scholarship - Noboru Hayama is the founder of Riso Scientific Industries Corporation
 Faculty Scholarships (scholarships aimed at those with sudden changes in household budgets)
 Loan-type
 General scholarships
 Emergency Special Scholarship (a scholarship aimed at those with sudden changes in household budgets)
 Emergency loan for school fees (a scholarship aimed at those with sudden changes in household budgets)

Student life

School festival 
 Tokiwa Festival
 A school festival shared by Jissen Women's University and the Junior College. The festival is held in October and November. The name of the Tokiwa Festival derives from "Tokiwamatsu-chō", the old town name of Shibuya, Tokyo, where the school building was located before it relocated to Hino City. Moreover, since the leaves of the evergreen pine tree are always green and do not change colour, it also includes the meaning of permanence.

University officials and organizations

University affiliate organizations 
 Mukōda Library
 Jissen Women's University Supporters' Association

List of university officials 
 List of people at Jissen Women's University

Facilities

Campuses

Hino Campus 
 Faculty using Hino Campus: Faculty of Human Life Science
 Graduate school using Hino Campus: Graduate School of Human Life Science
 Transportation access
 14-minute walk from Hino Station operated by JR East

Shibuya Campus 
 Faculties using Shibuya Campus: Faculty of Humanities, Faculty of Human and Social Studies, Junior College
 Graduate schools using Shibuya Campus: Graduate School of Humanities, Graduate School of Human and Social Studies
 Transportation access
 10-minute walk from Shibuya Station operated by JR East, Tōkyū, Keiō Electric Railway and Tokyo Metro Co., Ltd.
 12-minute walk from Omotesandō Station operated by Tokyo Metro

External affairs

Agreements with other universities 
 National, academic exchange, etc. partner universities
 The Open University of Japan
 International, academic exchange, etc. partner universities
 University of the Fraser Valley (British Columbia, Canada)
 Dankook University (Yongin, Gyeonggi Province, Korea)
 Communication University of China (Beijing, China)
 Dutch National Southern University (Limburg, The Netherlands)

Affiliated schools 
 Jissen Women's Educational Institute Junior and Senior Schools
 Jissen Women's University Junior College

See also 

 List of universities in Eastern Japan

References

External links

 Official website

Educational institutions established in 1899
Private universities and colleges in Japan
Universities and colleges in Tokyo
1899 establishments in Japan
Women's universities and colleges in Japan
Buildings and structures completed in 1985
Hino, Tokyo